Acidocella is a genus in the phylum Pseudomonadota (Bacteria). Its members are acidophilic.

Etymology
The name Acidocella derives from New Latin acidum (from Latin acidus, sour), an acid; Latin cella, a store-room, a chamber and, in biology, a cell; giving Acidocella, an acid (-requiring) cell.

Species
The genus contains:
 A. aluminiidurans Kimoto et al. 2010
 A. aminolytica (Kishimoto et al. 1994) Kishimoto et al. 1996, formerly a member of the genus Acidiphilium
 A. facilis  (Wichlacz et al. 1986) Kishimoto et al. 1996,  type species of the genus,  formerly a member of the genus Acidiphilium

See also
 Bacterial taxonomy
 Microbiology

References 

Bacteria genera
Rhodospirillales